Nuna (stylized in all caps) is the second extended play (promoted as her third) by Korean-American  rapper and singer Jessi. It was released on July 30, 2020 by P-Nation and distributed by Kakao M. It consists of six songs, including the previously released singles "Who Dat B" and "Drip", and the title track "Nunu Nana". This marks her first and only album release under P Nation and her first album in almost three years, following Un2verse in 2017.

Background and release 
Following the expiration of her recording contract with YMC Entertainment, under which she released her first EP Un2verse in July 2017, Jessi signed with Psy's self-formed record label P-Nation in January 2019. Her first release under the label, the single "Who Dat B" was released in September 2019, followed by the Jay Park collaboration "Drip" that November.

The EP was released on July 30, 2020, through several music portals including Melon and Apple Music.

Promotion

Singles 
"Who Dat B" was released as a standalone digital single on September 23, 2019 as her first release under P-Nation. The hip-hop and K-rap single, noted as a "bad girl anthem" driven by "biting lyrics and an infectious beat," peaked at number 68 on the Billboard Korea K-pop Hot 100 and at number eight on the Billboard World Digital Songs Sales chart. The music video for the single was released to her YouTube channel in conjunction with the single release. As of February 2021, it has 18.94 million views. 

"Drip" featuring Korean-American rapper Jay Park, was released as her second standalone single on November 2, 2019. The trap single is sung entirely in English and peaked at number 16 on the World Digital Songs Sales chart. The music video was released to her YouTube channel in conjunction with the single. As of February 2021, it has 11.43 million views. 

"Nunu Nana" (Korean: 눈누난나, stylized in all caps) was released as the EP's third single on July 30, 2020 alongside the release of the EP itself. A "hip-hop track with pop elements," the single became a commercial success in South Korea. "Nunu Nana" peaked at number two on the Gaon Digital Chart, becoming her first chart entry since "Gucci" peaked at number 99 in 2017, as well as her highest-charting song to date. The song also peaked at number two on the Billboard Korea K-pop Hot 100 and at number 17 on the World Digital Songs Sales chart. The music video, which stars South Korean musician Lee Hyori, was posted on July 30 and has 111.2 million views as of May 2021, making it her first music video to surpass 100 million views.

"Numb" was released as the final single from the EP on August 14, 2020. The music video was released that day and has 4.92 million views as of February 2021.

Track listing

Charts

Singles

"Who Dat B"

"Drip" (featuring Jay Park)

"Nunu Nana" (눈누난나) 

Weekly charts

Year-end charts

Accolades

Notes

References

2020 EPs
Jessi (musician) albums